The Swinging Skirts LPGA Classic was a women's professional golf tournament in California on the LPGA Tour, held at Lake Merced Golf Club in Daly City, an adjacent suburb south of San Francisco.  It debuted in April 2014, but ran for just three years, the LPGA Mediheal Championship succeeded it in 2018, also played at Lake Merced.

Course history
Originally designed by Willie Locke, Lake Merced Golf Club opened  in July 1923 and was re-designed in 1929 by Alister MacKenzie, architect of the Augusta National Golf Club. Robert Muir Graves re-routed the course in the 1960s to accommodate Interstate 280, and the most recent revision was completed by Rees Jones in 1996. Southeast of Lake Merced, the course is in close proximity to San Francisco Golf Club, Olympic Club, and TPC Harding Park.

Winners

 Succeeded by LPGA Mediheal Championship in 2018, also at Lake Merced Golf Club.

Tournament records

References

External links
Coverage on LPGA Tour official site
Lake Merced Golf Club - official site

Former LPGA Tour events
Golf in California
Sports competitions in San Francisco
Recurring sporting events established in 2014
Recurring sporting events disestablished in 2016
2014 establishments in California
2016 disestablishments in California
Women's sports in California